Barisan may refer to:

 Barisan Mountains, a mountain range on the island of Sumatra
 Barisan Nasional, a political party coalition in Malaysia
 Barisan Alternatif, a former political coalition in Malaysia
 Barisan Sosialis, a former political party that was split away from the People's Action Party in Singapore